James Robert Jones (born May 5, 1939) is an American lawyer, diplomat, Democratic politician, a retired U.S. Congressman from Oklahoma, and a former U.S. Ambassador to Mexico under President Bill Clinton.

Jones grew up in Muskogee, Oklahoma, and was involved in politics at an early age. He worked as a legislative assistant to U.S. Representative Ed Edmondson and as Appointments Secretary to U.S. President Lyndon B. Johnson.

In 1972, after returning to Oklahoma, Jones ran for Oklahoma's 1st congressional district. He won the election and was re-elected six times. During his tenure in Congress, which lasted until 1987, Jones served four years as the Chairman of the House Budget Committee.

Early life and career
Jones was born and educated in Muskogee, Oklahoma. By the age of 12, Jones was campaigning for Ed Edmondson's bid for Congress. He received his B.A. degree in 1961 from the University of Oklahoma, where he also joined Lambda Chi Alpha fraternity. Jones was accepted at Georgetown University Law Center (in Washington, D.C.) and graduated with an LL.B. in 1964.

Jones enlisted and served in the U.S. Army Reserve (from 1961 to 1968) and also served briefly in the Army Counterintelligence Corps (at the rank of captain, from 1964 to 1965). Jones was also admitted to the Oklahoma bar in 1964 and commenced his practice of law in Tulsa, Oklahoma.

Political career

Political staffer
Jones first important political job was as the legislative assistant for Congressman Ed Edmondson (1961–1964). Then, in 1965, Jones moved from the United States Congress to the White House where he served as Appointments Secretary (Chief of Staff) to U.S. President Lyndon B. Johnson, the youngest person to hold that position (until Johnson left office on January 20, 1969).

Congressional service
After Johnson left office, Jones returned to Oklahoma and resumed his law practice in Tulsa. He gave Belcher only his second credible reelection contest ever, holding him to 55 percent of the vote—a surprisingly close margin, considering that Belcher was ranking member of the House Agriculture Committee.

Jones was priming for a rematch in 1972, but Belcher didn't have the stomach for another bruising contest and pulled out of the race in June.  The Republicans recruited Tulsa Mayor Jim Hewgley as a replacement.  However, Jones won the November election by a fairly convincing 11-point margin—a surprising result, considering that Richard Nixon easily carried the 1st in the presidential election (Nixon won Tulsa County with a staggering 78 percent of the vote).  He is the first and only Democrat to have represented Tulsa in Congress since Dixie Gilmer left office in 1951. Jones was re-elected six times, serving until January 1987.

As a member of the tax-writing Ways and Means Committee, Jones secured House backing for a conservative tax cut in 1978. In 1979, he joined the House Budget Committee. Jones also was able to get Democrats to add more fiscal conservatives to the Budget Committee.

Jones decided to give up his House seat in 1986 to run against Republican incumbent U.S. Senator Don Nickles, even though he'd only narrowly defeated future Governor Frank Keating two years earlier for reelection to his House seat.  He lost to Nickles by 10 points.

He is also a member of the advisory board for the Mexico Institute.

Work after Congress
In 1987, Jones resumed the practice of law, joining the Washington-based firm of Dickstein Shapiro.   He later served as the Chairman of the American Stock Exchange (1989 to 1993).  After the election of Democratic President Bill Clinton, Jones was appointed the U.S. Ambassador to Mexico and served from 1993 until 1997. In February, 2003, he was inaugurated Chairman of the World Affairs Councils of America.

Presently, he is a resident of Tulsa and Washington, D.C.  He is a partner in the law firm Manatt, Phelps & Phillips. He also serves on the board of directors of the Committee for a Responsible Federal Budget.

In 1994, Jones was inducted into the Oklahoma Hall of Fame.

The Constitution Project

Jones agreed to serve on The Constitution Project's Guantanamo Task Force in December 2010.

See also
Politics of Oklahoma
Oklahoma Democratic Party
Oklahoma Congressional Districts
United States Ambassador to Mexico

References

External links

Jones bio at the Council of American Ambassadors webpage
 Encyclopedia of Oklahoma History and Culture - Jones, James
Voices of Oklahoma interview with James R. Jones. First person interview conducted on July 27, 2012, with James R. Jones. 
 
 James R. Jones Collection at the Carl Albert Center.

|-

|-

|-

|-

|-

|-

1939 births
Ambassadors of the United States to Mexico
Businesspeople from Tulsa, Oklahoma
Democratic Party members of the United States House of Representatives from Oklahoma
Georgetown University Law Center alumni
Lawyers from Tulsa, Oklahoma
Living people
Lyndon B. Johnson administration personnel
Military personnel from Oklahoma
Politicians from Muskogee, Oklahoma
Politicians from Tulsa, Oklahoma
United States Army officers
University of Oklahoma alumni
Lawyers from Washington, D.C.
White House Chiefs of Staff
World Affairs Councils
Constitution Project
20th-century American lawyers
20th-century American diplomats
21st-century American lawyers
Members of Congress who became lobbyists